François-André-Adrien Pluquet (14 June 1716 – 18 September 1790) was a French theologian and philosopher. Best known for his Dictionary of Heresies (1762), he also wrote treatises on determinism, sociability and luxury.

Life
Pluquet was born in Bayeux. He studied in Caen and Paris, becoming a licencié of the Sorbonne in 1750. He worked as tutor to the abbé de Choiseul, younger brother of the Duc de Choiseul, who provided him with a pension allowing him to pursue independent study.

Works
 Examen du fatalisme (Examination of determinism), 1757
 Dictionnaire des hérésies, des erreurs et des schismes (Dictionary of heresies, errors and schisms), 1762
 De la sociabilité (On sociability), 1767
 (tr. from Latin) Les livres classiques de l'Empire de la Chine (The classical books of the Chinese Empire) by François Noël. 7 vols, 1784–86.
 Traité philosophique et politique sur le luxe (Philosophical and political treatise on luxury), 2 vols, 1786

References

1716 births
1790 deaths
18th-century philosophers
Metaphysicians
French male non-fiction writers
18th-century French male writers